Agnontas is a beach village with a small port located on the Greek island of Skopelos. Agnontas is the alternative port for ferryboats and passenger hydrofoils when bad weather closes the main port of the town of Skopelos. Agnondas was an athlete from Skopelos, a champion of the Ancient Olympic Games in 569 BC. It is said that on his victorious return to Skopelos his ship landed in this port. His fellow islanders named the harbor in his honor.

References

External links
Agnontas Beach from the Skopelos Travel Local Guide

Beaches of Greece
Landforms of the Sporades
Skopelos